Frederick John "Fred" Hume (2 May 1892 – 17 February 1967) was the 28th mayor of Vancouver, British Columbia, from 1951 to 1958. He was born in New Westminster, British Columbia, where he served as mayor from 1933 to 1942. Although he was living in West Vancouver, he won election as Vancouver's mayor.

Hume owned the WHL Vancouver Canucks, and was an active supporter of the NHL expansion to Vancouver.  He was inducted to the Hockey Hall of Fame in the "Builders" category in 1962.

The Canucks award for the team's unsung hero is named the Fred J. Hume Award in honour of Hume and his efforts to bring the NHL to Vancouver. The WHL also named the award for the league's most gentlemanly player after Hume.

Hume was inducted into the Canadian Lacrosse Hall of Fame as a builder in 1965, the first year of inductees. 

Hume's home in West Vancouver was known for its Christmas-light display, which was taken over and expanded by current owner, Jim Pattison.

References

External links
 
 Vancouver History: list of mayors, accessed 24 August 2006

1892 births
1967 deaths
Hockey Hall of Fame inductees
Mayors of Vancouver
People from New Westminster
Vancouver Canucks personnel
20th-century Canadian politicians